To Dance with the White Dog is a 1990 novel by Georgia author Terry Kay, based on the experiences of his father.

Plot summary
Sam Peek happily resides in Hart County, Georgia, as a pecan farmer and local celebrity featured in many gardening/horticultural magazines. His wife Cora and he are both in their 80s, and have just celebrated their 50th wedding anniversary.  Cora dies of a heart attack. Sam and his family are deeply grieved over this, and his daughters begin to obsess over his safety and his life.

Not long after Cora's death, a mysterious white dog that only Sam can see appears near the house. He thinks it is just a stray, but daughters Kate, Carrie, and his other children do not see it and think he is going crazy. Sam goes on a car trip in his weathered truck to a school reunion, keeping it a secret from the children. After a series of events, the family and other people begin to see the white dog, but never hear her bark. Shortly before Sam's death, the dog disappears, and the dog is thought to have been Cora in another form.

Film adaptation
The novel was adapted into a Hallmark Hall of Fame television movie starring Hume Cronyn as Sam Peek and Jessica Tandy as Cora. It was directed by Glenn Jordan and was filmed on location in Georgia.  The movie premiered December 5, 1993, on CBS, and was nominated for many awards including seven Primetime Emmy Awards. Hume Cronyn won an Emmy award for his performance. Nominations were given to lead actress Jessica Tandy, directing (Glenn Jordan), Sound Mixing, Sound Editing and Film Editing,

Cast
 Hume Cronyn as Sam Peek
 Jessica Tandy as Cora
 Christine Baranski as Kate
 Amy Wright as Carrie
 Frank Whaley as James
 Harley Cross as Bobby
 Esther Rolle as Neelie
 Lane Bradbury as Mildred Cook
 Ed Grady as Herman Morris

See also

References

External links
 
 To Dance With the White Dog on Amazon.com

1990 American novels
1993 drama films
Films about dogs
Hallmark Hall of Fame episodes
1993 television films
1993 films
Novels set in Georgia (U.S. state)
Hart County, Georgia
1990s English-language films